Urothoides kurrawa is a species of amphipod crustacean, in the family Urothoidae. The species was first described in 1979 by Barnard & Drummond. The holotype was collected at Crib Point on Westernport Bay.

References

Gammaridea
Crustaceans described in 1979